The Zamzam Well is a well in the Masjid al-Haram in Mecca, Saudi Arabia.

Zamzam or Zam Zam may also refer to:

 Zamzam (given name)
 Zamzam (soft drink), a soft drink produced in Iran
 Zamzam (party), a Jordanian political party
 , an Egyptian ship sunk by a German auxiliary cruiser in April 1941
 Zam Zam (film), a 2021 Indian Malayalam-language film
 Zichron Menachem (ZAMZAM), an Israeli association for the support of children with cancer and their families
 Zamzam, Libya, a settlement in Sirte

See also
 Zamzama, a cannon outside Lahore Museum, immortalized by Rudyard Kipling in his novel Kim